Kasal is a 2018 Filipino romance drama film starring Bea Alonzo, Derek Ramsay and Paulo Avelino. The film was directed by Ruel S. Bayani and produced by Star Cinema.

The film marks Derek Ramsay's comeback film for Star Cinema. It also served as Star Cinema's 25th Anniversary offering.

The film is about the story of a public school teacher, Lia Marquez (Bea), who, when deciding to marry Cebu’s most eligible bachelor and mayoral candidate, Philip Cordero (Paulo), is thrust into working with her ex-boyfriend Wado dela Costa (Derek) when he comes back into her life.

Cast
Bea Alonzo as Lia Marquez
Paulo Avelino as Philip Cordero
Derek Ramsay as Wado Dela Costa
Kylie Verzosa as Eunice Valdez
Christopher de Leon as Mayor Ernesto Cordero
Cherie Gil as Helen
Ricky Davao as Paul
Celeste Legaspi as Choleng
Ces Quesada as Sally
Vin Abrenica as Arvin
Cris Villonco as Michelle
Cai Cortez as Kaye
JC Alcantara as Michael
John Lapus as Anton
Bobby Andrews as Alfie
Eva Darren as Lola Rowena
Barbie Imperial as Clara

Theme song
Kasal Movie 2018 Philippine Romantic Drama Film into Theme song of Tagpuan was Performed by Moira Dela Torre.

Box office results
Kasal earned approximately ₱100 million in a span of 13 days since its release according to Star Cinema.
With its international screenings in full swing, Star Cinema's "Kasal" entered the top 20 in United States box office over the last weekend of May 2018, according to a report published on the New York Times.

Awards and nominations
Bea Alonzo Best Actress Won in Pinakapasadong Award in GAWAD Pasado Awards 2019.
Paulo Avelino Best Actor Won in Pinakapasadong Award in GAWAD Pasado Awards 2019.
Ricky Davao Best Supporting Actor Won in Pinakapasadong Award in GAWAD Pasado Awards 2019.
Derek Ramsay Best Supporting Actor Nom in Pinakapasadong Award in GAWAD Pasado Awards 2019.
Ricky Davao Best Supporting Actor Nomination in 3rd Eddys (Entertainment Editors’ Choice) of the SPEEd (Society of Philippine Entertainment Editors).

Awards
Bea Alonzo Best Actress for GAWAD Pasado Awards 2019 
Paulo Avelino Best Actor for GAWAD Pasado Awards 2019
Ricky Davao Best Supporting Actor for GAWAD Pasado Awards 2019

References

External links
 

2018 films
Philippine romantic drama films